Abercius is a martyr of the Christian church. He was killed by the sword. His feast day is February 28.

See also
Saint Abercius, martyr, feast day 5 December
Abercius and Helena, first-century martyrs, feast day 20 May

References

Sources
Holweck, F. G., A Biographical Dictionary of the Saints. St. Louis, MO: B. Herder Book Co., 1924.

Year of death missing
Christian saints in unknown century
Christian martyrs
Year of birth unknown